In algebraic geometry, a new scheme (e.g. an algebraic variety) can be obtained by gluing existing schemes through gluing maps.

Statement 
Suppose there is a (possibly infinite) family of schemes  and for pairs , there are open subsets  and isomorphisms . Now, if the isomorphisms are compatible in the sense: for each ,
 ,
 ,
then there exists a scheme X, together with the morphisms  such that
  is an isomorphism onto an open subset of X,
 
 

Examples

Projective line 

Let  be two copies of the affine line over a field k. Let  be the complement of the origin and  defined similarly.
 and 
where the two rings are viewed as subrings of the function field . But this means that ; because, by definition,  is covered by the two open affine charts whose affine rings are of the above form.

Affine line with doubled origin 
Let  be as in the above example. So, geometrically,  is obtained by identifying two parallel lines except the origin; i.e., it is an affine line with the doubled origin. (It can be shown that Z is not a separated scheme.) In contrast, if two lines are glued so that origin on the one line corresponds to the (illusionary) point at infinity for the other line; i.e, use the isomrophism , then the resulting scheme is, at least visually, the projective line .

Fiber products and pushouts of schemes 

The category of schemes admits both a finite fiber product and a finite pushout; they both are constructed by gluing affine schemes. For affine schemes, fiber products and pushouts correspond to tensor products and fiber squares of algebras.

References 

Scheme theory